Hermosita sangria is a brightly coloured species of sea slug, specifically an aeolid nudibranch. It is a marine gastropod mollusc in the family Facelinidae.

Distribution
The holotype of this species was found at 17 m depth at Isla San Benito Oueste,  on the Pacific Ocean coast of Baja California, Mexico. Additional specimens used in the original description were from nearby Isla Cedros and  Bahia Magdelana, Pacific Ocean, Mexico. It has also been reported from Costa Rica.

Biology
Hermosita sangria feeds on the hydroid Solanderia.

References

Facelinidae
Gastropods described in 1986